New Road (Nepal Bhasa: न्हु सडक) is the financial hub and a busy high street in Kathmandu, Nepal Nepal. It refers to a two lane street in the center of Kathmandu, as well as the surrounding neighborhood. It is one of the busiest marketplaces in the city. Being near the midpoint of the ring road in Kathmandu, as well as the old center of Kathmandu (Kathmandu Durbar Square, also known as Basantapur, Kathmandu), it is one of the central locations in the city.

History
The road was built during the period of prime ministership Juddha Shumsher Jung Bahadur Rana after the 1934 Nepal–India earthquake destroyed many buildings in the Kathmandu Valley. It was formally called Juddha Sadak in his honor. The road can also be referred as old Kings Way of Nepal, as the road leads to old royal palace of Royal Families, Kathmandu Durbar Square which is a UNESCO World Heritage Site.
The inhabitants of New Road are mostly Newars.
After the fall of autocratic Rana regime, it was renamed New Road.

Notable buildings
The headquarter of Nepal Airlines is located on the Eastern end of New Road, next to New Road Gate, which marks the start of New Road at the crossing with Kantipath. A statue of Juddha Shumsher Jung Bahadur Rana is located at the westernmost roundabout of the road
Head offices of Gorkhapatra Sansthan and Nepal Bank Limited are also located at New Road.
Bhughol Park is located on the southwestern corner of the street.

References

5. Nepal's new Kaligandaki highway

Streets in Kathmandu
Economy of Kathmandu